Juliano Gonçalves Spadacio (born 16 November 1980) is a Brazilian retired footballer. In 2009–10, he was named Midfielder of the Year of the Romanian Liga I. Juliano on 6 September 2011, signed a two-year contract with the Greek club PAOK.

References

External links
 
 
 
 

1980 births
Living people
People from Dracena
Brazilian people of Italian descent
Brazilian footballers
Brazilian expatriate footballers
Association football midfielders
Esporte Clube XV de Novembro (Jaú) players
Ituano FC players
União São João Esporte Clube players
Sport Club Corinthians Paulista players
Paulista Futebol Clube players
Club Athletico Paranaense players
FC Red Bull Salzburg players
C.D. Nacional players
FC Rapid București players
PAOK FC players
FC Astra Giurgiu players
Anorthosis Famagusta F.C. players
Expatriate footballers in Austria
Expatriate footballers in Romania
Expatriate footballers in Greece
Expatriate footballers in Cyprus
Brazilian expatriate sportspeople in Romania
Brazilian expatriate sportspeople in Austria
Brazilian expatriate sportspeople in Cyprus
Brazilian expatriate sportspeople in Israel
Primeira Liga players
Liga I players
Super League Greece players
Israeli Premier League players
Cypriot First Division players
Footballers from São Paulo (state)